George Emanuel Lewis (born July 14, 1952) is an American composer, performer, and scholar of experimental music. He has been a member of the Association for the Advancement of Creative Musicians (AACM) since 1971, when he joined the organization at the age of 19. He is renowned for his work as an improvising trombonist and considered a pioneer of computer music, which he began pursuing in the late 1970s; in the 1980s he created Voyager, an improvising software he has used in interactive performances. Lewis's many honors include a MacArthur Fellowship and a Guggenheim Fellowship, and his book A Power Stronger Than Itself: The AACM and American Experimental Music received the American Book Award. Lewis is the Edwin H. Case Professor of American Music, Composition & Historical Musicology at Columbia University.

Biography 

Born in Chicago, Illinois, Lewis first encountered the AACM while taking a year off from Yale University at the age of 19. Members encouraged him to finish his degree, and he graduated from Yale in 1974 with a degree in philosophy. Shortly after, he released Solo Trombone Record to great acclaim. Lewis has long been active in creating and performing with interactive computer systems, most notably his software Voyager, which "listens" and reacts to live performers.

Lewis has recorded or performed with Anthony Braxton, Anthony Davis, Bertram Turetzky, Conny Bauer, Count Basie, David Behrman, David Murray, Derek Bailey, Douglas Ewart, Alfred Harth, Evan Parker, Fred Anderson, Frederic Rzewski, Gil Evans, Han Bennink, Irène Schweizer, J. D. Parran, James Newton, Joel Ryan, Joëlle Léandre, John Zorn, Karl E. H. Seigfried, Laurie Anderson, Leroy Jenkins, Marina Rosenfeld, Michel Portal, Misha Mengelberg, Miya Masaoka, Muhal Richard Abrams, Nicole Mitchell, Richard Teitelbaum, Roscoe Mitchell, Sam Rivers, Steve Lacy, and Wadada Leo Smith.

Lewis has also performed with Frederic Rzewski and Alvin Curran's Musica Elettronica Viva, as well as the Globe Unity Orchestra and the ICP Orchestra (Instant Composer's Pool).

In the 1980s, Lewis succeeded Rhys Chatham as the music director of The Kitchen.

Between 1988 and 1990, Lewis collaborated with video artist Don Ritter to create performances of interactive music and interactive video controlled by Lewis's improvised trombone.

In 1992, Lewis collaborated with Canadian artist Stan Douglas on the video installation Hors-champs which was featured at documenta 9 in Kassel, Germany. The installation features Lewis in an improvisation of Albert Ayler's "Spirits Rejoice" with musicians Douglas Ewart, Kent Carter and Oliver Johnson.

In 2002, Lewis received a MacArthur Fellowship. His many honors also include a Guggenheim Fellowship (2015), a United States Artists Fellowship (2011), the Alpert Award in the Arts (1999), and the American Musicological Society's Music in American Culture Award in 2009. He became a Fellow of the American Academy of Arts and Sciences in 2015, a Corresponding Fellow of the British Academy in 2016, and a member of the American Academy of Arts and Letters in 2018. Lewis has received four honorary degrees: Doctor of Music from the University of Edinburgh in 2015, Doctor of Humane Letters from New College of Florida in 2017, Doctor of Music from Harvard University in 2018, and Doctor of Music from the University of Pennsylvania in 2022.

Since 2004, he has served as Edward H. Case Professor of American Music at Columbia University in New York City. He previously taught at the University of California, San Diego.

Lewis is featured extensively in Unyazi of the Bushveld (2005), directed by Aryan Kaganof, a documentary about the first symposium of electronic music held in Africa. Lewis gave an invited keynote lecture and performance at NIME-06, the sixth international conference on New Interfaces for Musical Expression, which was held at IRCAM, Paris, in June 2006.

In 2008, his work "Morning Blues for Yvan" was featured on the compilation album Crosstalk: American Speech Music (Bridge Records), produced by Mendi + Keith Obadike.

Also in 2008, Lewis published a book-length history of the AACM titled A Power Stronger Than Itself: The AACM and American Experimental Music (University of Chicago Press). The book received the 2009 American Book Award. Lewis later wrote an opera based on the book, titling it Afterword: The AACM (as) Opera; the work premiered at the Museum of Contemporary Art Chicago in 2015.

In April 2022, the International Contemporary Ensemble announced the appointment of Lewis as its next artistic director, effective April 2022.

Discography

As sole leader 
 Solo Trombone Record (Sackville, 1976)
 George Lewis (Black Saint, 1977)
 George Lewis Douglas Ewart (Black Saint, 1978)
 Homage to Charles Parker (Black Saint, 1979)
 Chicago Slow Dance (1977) (Lovely, 1981)
 Yankees (Charly, 1982)
 Change of Season (Soul Note, 1986)
 Dutch Masters (Soul Note, 1987)
 Sachse, Joe: Berlin Tango (Jazzwerkstatt, 1987)
 Voyager (Avant, 1993)
 Changing With the Times (New World, 1993)
 The Usual Turmoil and Other Duets (Music & Arts, 1998)
 Conversations (Incus, 1998)
 Endless Shout (Tzadik, 2000)
 The Shadowgraph Series: Compositions for Creative (Spool, 2001)
 From Saxophone & Trombone (PSI, 2002)
 Streaming (Pi, 2006)
 George Lewis: Les Exercices Spirituels (Tzadik, 2011)
 Sequel (For Lester Bowie) (Intakt, 2011)
 Sonic Rivers (Tzadik, 2014)
 Rainbow Family (1984), with Douglas Ewart, Joëlle Léandre, Derek Bailey, Steve Lacy (Carrier, 2020)
 The Recombinant Trilogy (New Focus, 2021)

As co-leader 
 Elements of Surprise (Moers, 1976 [1978]) with Anthony Braxton
 Company, Fables (Incus, 1980) with Derek Bailey, Evan Parker, and Dave Holland
 Hook, Drift & Shuffle (Incus, 1985) with Parker, Barry Guy and Paul Lytton
 News for Lulu (hat Hut, 1988) with Zorn and Bill Frisell
 More News for Lulu (hat Hut, 1992; recorded 1989) with Zorn and Frisell
 Donaueschingen (Duo) 1976 (hatART, 1994; recorded 1976) with Braxton
 Slideride (hat Hut, 1994) with Ray Anderson, Craig Harris, and Gary Valente
 Triangulation (Nine Winds, 1996) with Vinny Golia and Bertram Turetzky
 Live at Taktlos with Irene Schweizer (Intakt, 1986)
 The Storming of the Winter Palace (Intakt, 1988) with Irene Schweizer, Maggie Nicols, Joëlle Léandre, and Günter Sommer
 Transatlantic Visions (RogueArt, 2009) with Joëlle Léandre
 Sour Mash (Innova, 2009) with Marina Rosenfeld
 Metamorphic Rock (Iorram, 2009) with Glasgow Improvisers Orchestra
 The Will to Adorn, with International Contemporary Ensemble (Tundra, 2016)
 Creative Construction Set™, with Splitter Orchester (Mikroton, 2016)
 Assemblage, with Ensemble Dal Niente (New World Records, 2017)
 Kimmig-Studer-Zimmerlin & George Lewis, with Kimmig-Studer-Zimmerlin (ezz-thetics, 2019)
 Voyage And Homecoming, with Roscoe Mitchell (RogueArt, 2019)
 Play As You Go, with Joëlle Léandre, Pauline Oliveros (Trost, 2021)

As sideman 
With Muhal Richard Abrams
 Spihumonesty (Black Saint, 1979)
 Mama and Daddy (Black Saint, 1980)
 SoundDance (Pi, 2011)

With Anthony Braxton
 The Montreux/Berlin Concerts (Arista, 1975–6)
 Creative Orchestra Music 1976 (Arista, 1976)
 Creative Orchestra (Köln) 1978 (hatART, 1978 [1995])
 Four Compositions (Quartet) 1983 (Black Saint, 1983)
 Dortmund (Quartet) 1976 (hatART, 1976 released 1991)
 Ensemble (Victoriaville) 1988 (Victo, 1988 [1992])
 News from the '70s (recorded 1971–1976, New Tone, 1999)
 Quintet (Basel) 1977 (hatOLOGY, 1977, released 2000)

With Anthony Davis
 Episteme (Gramavision)
 Hemispheres (Gramavision)
 Variations in Dream Time (Gramavision)
 Hidden Voices (India Navigation)

With Gil Evans
 Live at the Public Theater (New York 1980) (Trio, 1981)
 Lunar Eclypse (recorded 1981, New Tone, 1993)

With Globe Unity Orchestra
 20th Anniversary (FMP, 1993; recorded 1986)
 Globe Unity – 40 Years (Intakt, 2007)

With ICP Orchestra
 Bospaadje Konijnehol I (1986)
 ICP Plays Monk (1986)

With Steve Lacy
Prospectus (hat ART, 1983) also released as Cliches
 Futurities (hat Hut, 1985)
 The Beat Suite (Sunnyside, 2001)
 Last Tour (Eminem, 2004)

With Roscoe Mitchell
 Roscoe Mitchell Quartet (Sackville, 1975)
 Nonaah (Nessa, 1977)
 L-R-G / The Maze / S II Examples (Nessa, 1978)
 Sketches from Bamboo (Moers, 1979)
 Nine to Get Ready (ECM, 1997)

With David Murray
 Ming (Black Saint, 1980)
 Home (Black Saint, 1982)

With Richard Teitelbaum
 Concerto Grosso (hat Hut, 1988)
 Cyberband (Moers, 1993)
 Golem (Tzadik, 1995)

With others
 Barry Altschul, You Can't Name Your Own Tune (Muse, 1977)
 Fred Anderson, Another Place (Moers, 1979)
 Jacques Bekaert, Summer Music 1970 (Lovely/Vital, 1979)
 Leo Smith Creative Orchestra, Budding of a Rose (Moers, 1979)
 Leroy Jenkins, Space Minds, New Worlds, Survival of America (Tomato, 1979)
 Sam Rivers, Contrasts (ECM, 1979)
 Material, Memory Serves (Celluloid, 1981)
 John Zorn, Archery (Parachute, 1981)
 Laurie Anderson, Big Science (Warner Bros., 1981)
 John Lindberg Trio, Give and Take (Black Saint, 1982)
 Rhys Chatham, Factor X (Moers, 1983)
 Joelle Leandre, Les Douze Sons (NATO, 1985)
 Ushio Torikai, Go Where? (Victor, 1986)
 Heiner Goebbels, Der Mann im Fahrstuhl (ECM, 1987)
 India Cooke, RedHanded (Music & Arts, 1996)
 Steve Coleman, Genesis & The Opening of the Way (BMG/RCA Victor, 1997)
 Evod Magek, Through Love to Freedom (Black Pot, 1998)
 Miya Masaoka Orchestra, What Is the Difference Between Stripping and Playing the Violin? (Victo, 1998)
 NOW Orchestra, WOWOW (Spool, 1999)
 Bert Turetzky & Mike Wofford, Transition and Transformation (Nine Winds, 2001)
 Musica Elettronica Viva, MEV 40 (New World, 2008)
 Paul Rutherford, Tetralogy (Emanem, 2009)

Compositions
Solo and chamber music
 "Toneburst" (1976) for three trombones
 "Endless Shout" (1994), for piano
 "Collage" (1995), for poet and chamber orchestra, with text by Quincy Troupe
 "Ring Shout Ramble" (1998), for saxophone quartet
 "Signifying Riffs" (1998), for string quartet and percussion
 "Dancing in the Palace" (2009), for tenor voice and viola, with text by Donald Hall
 "Ikons" (2010), for octet
 "The Will To Adorn" (2011), for large chamber ensemble
 "Thistledown" (2012), for quartet

Electronics
 "Atlantic" (1978), for amplified trombones with resonant filters
 "Nightmare At The Best Western" (1992), for baritone voice and six instruments
 "Virtual Discourse" (1993), composition for infrared-controlled "virtual percussion" and four percussionists
 "North Star Boogaloo" (1996), for percussionist and computer,  with text by Quincy Troupe
 "Crazy Quilt" (2002), for infrared-controlled "virtual percussion" and four percussionists  
 "Hello Mary Lou" (2007) for chamber ensemble and live electronics
 "Sour Mash" (2009), composition for vinyl turntablists, with Marina Rosenfeld
 "Les Exercices Spirituels" (2010) for eight instruments and computer sound spatialization
 "Anthem" (2011), for chamber ensemble with electronics

Installations
 "Mbirascope/Algorithme et kalimba" (1985), interactive mbira-driven audiovisual installation, with David Behrman
 "A Map of the Known World" (1987), interactive mbira-driven audiovisual installation, with David Behrman
 "Rio Negro" (1992), robotic-acoustic sound-sculpture installation, with Douglas Ewart
 "Information Station No. 1" (2000), multi-screen videosonic interactive installation for the Point Loma Wastewater Treatment Plant, San Diego, Calif. 
 "Rio Negro II" (2007), robotic-acoustic sound installation, with Douglas Ewart and Douglas Irving Repetto.
 "Travelogue" (2009), sound installation
 "Ikons" (2010), interactive sound sculpture, with Eric Metcalfe

Interactive computer music
 "The KIM and I" (1979), for micro-computer and improvising musician
 "Chamber Music for Humans and Non-Humans" (1980),  for micro-computer and improvising musician
 "Rainbow Family" (1984), for soloists with multiple interactive computer systems
 "Voyager" (1987), for improvising soloist and interactive “virtual orchestra"
 "Virtual Concerto" (2004), for improvising computer piano soloist and orchestra
 "Interactive Trio" (2007), for interactive computer-driven piano, human pianist, and additional instrumentalist
 "Interactive Duo" (2007), for interactive computer-driven piano and human instrumentalist

Music Theatre
 "The Empty Chair" (1986), computer-driven videosonic music theatre work
 "Changing With The Times" (1991), radiophonic/music theatre work

Creative orchestra
 "The Shadowgraph Series, 1-5" (1975–77)
 "Hello and Goodbye" (1976/2000) 
 "Angry Bird" (2007)
 "Fractals" (2007)
 "Shuffle" (2007)
 "The Chicken Skin II" (2007)
 "Something Like Fred" (2009)
 "Triangle" (2009)
 Minds in Flux (2021)

Graphic and instructional scores
 "Monads" (1977), graphic score for any instrumentation
 "The Imaginary Suite" (1977), two movements for tape, live electronics, and instruments  
 "Chicago Slow Dance" (1977), for electro-acoustic ensemble
 "Blues" (1979), graphic score for four instruments
 "Homage to Charles Parker" (1979), for improvisors and electronics
 "Sequel" (2004), for eight electro-acoustic performers
 "Artificial Life 2007" (2007), composition for improvisors with open instrumentation

Books and articles

Monographs

Edited collections

Articles and chapters 
 Lewis, George E. "Americanist Musicology and Nomadic Noise." Journal of the American Musicological Society, Vol. 64, No. 3 (Fall 2011), pp. 691–95.
 Lewis, George E. "Interactivity and Improvisation". In Dean, Roger T., ed. The Oxford Handbook of Computer Music. New York and Oxford: Oxford University Press (2009), 457-66.
 Lewis, George E. "The Virtual Discourses of Pamela Z". In Hassan, Salah M., and Cheryl Finley, eds. Diaspora, Memory, Place: David Hammons, Maria Magdalena Campos-Pons, Pamela Z. Munich: Prestel (2008), 266-81.
 Lewis, George E., "Foreword: After Afrofuturism." Journal of the Society for American Music, Volume 2, Number 2, pp. 139–53 (2008).
 Lewis, George E., "Stan Douglas's Suspiria: Genealogies of Recombinant Narrativity." In Stan Douglas, Past Imperfect: Works 1986-2007. Ostfildern, Germany: Hatje Cantz Verlag, 42-53 (2008).
 Lewis, George E., "Improvising Tomorrow's Bodies: The Politics of Transduction." E-misférica, Vol. 4.2, November 2007.
 Lewis, George E., "Mobilitas Animi: Improvising Technologies, Intending Chance." Parallax, Vol. 13, No. 4, (2007), 108–122.
 Lewis, George E., "Living with Creative Machines: An Improvisor Reflects." In Anna Everett and Amber J. Wallace, eds. AfroGEEKS: Beyond the Digital Divide. Santa Barbara: Center for Black Studies Research, 2007, 83-99.
 Lewis, George E. "Live Algorithms and the Future of Music." CT Watch Quarterly, May 2007.
 Lewis, George E. Improvisation and the Orchestra: A Composer Reflects. Contemporary Music Review, Vol. 25, Nos. 5/6, October/December 2006, pp. 429–34.
 Lewis, George E. "The Secret Love between Interactivity and Improvisation, or Missing in Interaction: A Prehistory of Computer Interactivity". In Fähndrich, Walter, ed. Improvisation V: 14 Beiträge. Winterthur: Amadeus (2003), 193-203.
 Lewis, George E. 2004. "Gittin' to Know Y'all: Improvised Music, Interculturalism and the Racial Imagination". Critical Studies in Improvisation, Vol. 1, No. 1, ISSN 1712-0624, www.criticalimprov.com.
 Lewis, George E. 2004. "Leben mit kreativen Maschinen: Reflexionen eines improvisierenden Musikers". In Knauer, Wolfram, ed. Improvisieren: Darmstädter Beiträge zur Jazzforschung, Band 8. Hofheim: Wolke Verlag, 123-144.
 Lewis, George. 2004. Afterword to "Improvised Music After 1950": The Changing Same. In Fischlin, Daniel, and Ajay Heble, eds. The Other Side of Nowhere: Jazz, Improvisation, and Communities in Dialogue. Middletown: Wesleyan University Press, 163-72.
 Lewis, George E., "Too Many Notes: Computers, complexity and culture in Voyager." Leonardo Music Journal 10, 2000, 33-39. Reprinted in Everett, Anna, and John T. Caldwell, eds. 2003. New Media: Theories and Practices of Intertextuality. New York and London: Routledge, 93-106.
 Lewis, George, "Teaching Improvised Music: An Ethnographic Memoir." In Zorn, John, ed. Arcana: Musicians on Music. New York: Granary Books (2000), 78-109.
 Lewis, George, "Improvised Music After 1950: Afrological and Eurological Perspectives." Black Music Research Journal, vol. 16, No.1, Spring 1996, 91-122. Excerpted in Cox, Christoph, and Daniel Warner. 2004. Audio Culture: Readings In Modern Music. New York: Continuum, 272-86.

References

External links

 George Lewis faculty profile from Columbia University site
 Casserley, Lawrence.  Interview with George Lewis, discussing computer music and other topics, including improvisation and Voyager
 Golden, Barbara. "Conversation with George Lewis." eContact! 12.2 — Interviews (2) (April 2010). Montréal: CEC.

American jazz trombonists
Male trombonists
Free jazz trombonists
MacArthur Fellows
1952 births
Living people
Musicians from Chicago
Tzadik Records artists
Yale University alumni
Columbia University faculty
University of California, San Diego faculty
American Book Award winners
Corresponding Fellows of the British Academy
Jazz musicians from Illinois
21st-century trombonists
American male jazz musicians
Globe Unity Orchestra members
Sackville Records artists
Music & Arts artists
Black Saint/Soul Note artists
Pi Recordings artists
Charly Records artists
Incus Records artists
RogueArt artists
21st-century American male musicians
Members of the American Academy of Arts and Letters